The 1974 Big League World Series took place from August 10–17 in Fort Lauderdale, Florida, United States. Taipei, Taiwan defeated San Antonio, Texas in the championship game.

This year saw the debut of the Far East, and Mexico regions.

Teams

Results

References

Big League World Series
Big League World Series